Ptenodactylus is a scientific name which has been used for several distinct genera of animals. It may refer to:

 Ptenodactylus (Gray, 1845): A junior synonym of the lizard genus Pristidactylus
 "Ptenodactylus" (Seeley, 1869): A nomen nudum which in the 19th century was used to refer to at least 21 species of pterosaur including:
 "Ptenodactylus" brachyrhinus: A synonym of Ornithocheirus brachyrhinus (nomen dubium)
 "Ptenodactylus" capito: A synonym of Ornithocheirus capito
 "Ptenodactylus" colorhinus: A synonym of Camposipterus colorhinus.
 "Ptenodactylus" crassidens: A synonym of Ornithocheirus crassidens.  (nomen dubium)
 "Ptenodactylus" cuvieri: A synonym of Cimoliopterus cuvieri.
 "Ptenodactylus" dentatus: A synonym of Ornithocheirus dentatus. (nomen dubium)
 "Ptenodactylus" enchorhynchus: A synonym of Ornithocheirus enchorhynchus (nomen dubium)
 "Ptenodactylus" eurygnathus: A synonym of Ornithocheirus eurygnathus.  (nomen dubium)
 "Ptenodactylus" fittoni: A synonym of Pterodactylus fittoni  (nomen dubium)
 "Ptenodactylus" machaerorhynchus: A synonym of Lonchodraco machaerorhynchus
 "Ptenodactylus macrorhinus": A nomen nudum
 "Ptenodactylus" microdon: A synonym of Lonchodraco microdon
 "Ptenodactylus" nasutus: A synonym of Camposipterus nasutus
 "Ptenodactylus" oweni: A synonym of Lonchodraco microdon
 "Ptenodactylus" oxyrhinus: A synonym of Ornithocheirus oxyrhinus (nomen dubium)
 "Ptenodactylus" platystomus: A synonym of Ornithocheirus platystomus.
 "Ptenodactylus" polyodon: A synonym of Ornithocheirus polyodon
 "Ptenodactylus" scaphorhynchus: A synonym of Ornithocheirus scaphorhynchus.  (nomen dubium)
 "Ptenodactylus" sedgwicki: A synonym of Camposipterus sedgwickii.
 "Ptenodactylus" tenuirostris: A synonym of Ornithocheirus tenuirostris (nomen dubium)
 "Ptenodactylus" woodwardi: A synonym of Pterodactylus woodwardi (nomen dubium)

References

Pterodactyloids
Lizard genera